Wendy Cork (born 25 July) is an Australian costume designer for film, theatre and television. She is best known for her work on Ladies in Black, Banished, Predestination and Beneath Hill 60.

Life and career
Wendy Cork was born in Goulburn, Australia and graduated from the University of New South Wales with a bachelor of arts in theatre and film. She started her career working in theatre and opera. She made her debut as a costume designer with the film In the Winter Dark, directed by James Bogle in 1998. She also designed the computer-generated clothes for the Rockstar Play-station game, L.A. Noire.

In 2014, she won Hero Frock Hire Award for costume design at the Australian Production Design Guild Awards on a feature film Predestination, directed by The Spierig Brothers starring Ethan Hawke and Sarah Snook. Later she worked with Jimmy McGovern's  period drama Banished, which was screened on BBC Two. She won Best Costume Design at the AACTA Awards for Ladies in Black, directed by Bruce Beresford.

Filmography
 In the Winter Dark (1998)
 A Wreck A Tangle (2000)
 The Djarn Djarns (2005)
 The Illustrated Family Doctor (2005)
 The Eternity Man (2008)
 Into My Arms (2009)
 My Mind's Own Melody (2012)
 The Turning (2013)
 Predestination (2014)
 Deep Water: The Real Story (2018)
 Grace (2018)
 Winchester (2018)
 Ladies in Black (2018)

Television 
 The Farm (2001)
 Counterstrike (2002)
 Fat Cow Motel (2003)
 Go Big (2004)
 Small Claims (2004)
 Hell Has Harbour Views (2005)
 Small Claims: White Wedding (2005)
 Small Claims: The Reunion (2006)
 BlackJack (Second trilogy) (2006-2007)
 Dangerous (2007)
 East West 101 (2007-2008)
 Valentine's Day (2008)
 Sea Patrol (2009-2010)
 Panic at Rock Island (2011)
 Crownies (2011)
 The Great Mint Swindle (2012)
 The Mystery of a Hansom Cab (2012)
 Twentysomething (2013)
 INXS: Never Tear Us Apart (2014)
 Banished (2015)
 Indian Summers (2016)
 Olivia Newton-John: Hopelessly Devoted to You (2018)
 Secret City (2018)

Awards and nominations

References

External links 
 
 

Living people
Australian costume designers
People from Sydney
Year of birth missing (living people)